The Shanghai Drug Abuse Treatment Centre, or SDATC, is a governmental organization providing drug abuse treatment and rehabilitation services in Shanghai, China. SDATC is the only government-supported centre in Shanghai and was established in 1997 on the approval of Shanghai Narcotic Control Commission and Shanghai Public Health Bureau.

SDATC is one of the departments of Shanghai Mental Health Center (SMHC), which is one of the largest and more comprehensive mental health institutions in China. SMHC has multi-functions including prevention, clinical, teaching and training, research, supervision, etc.

Goals
SDATC's goals are:

To provide treatment and other services to drug users
To train university students, doctors from other national areas, postgraduate students, continuing education courses, and other specific training programs in the field of drug dependence and treatment.
To promote and develop research on drug treatment through the participation in various programs financed by national and international foundations.
To interact with the local communities in the promotion of anti-drug activities
To be involved as consultants in policy making process regarding drug abuse prevention, treatment and rehabilitation.

Services
Shanghai Drug Abuse Treatment Centre provides a number of drug treatment services including:

Methadone tapering detoxification
Medical treatment for other physical and psychiatric conditions
Relapse prevention
Group therapy
HIV/AIDS prevention education
Family education
Hotline counseling

See also
Public health in China

References

External links
Website 
 Ascendant New York

1997 establishments in China
Organizations established in 1997
Organizations based in Shanghai
Government agencies of China
Health in Shanghai
Addiction organizations in China